Kálmán Szathmáry (born 6 April 1890, date of death unknown) was a Hungarian athlete. He competed in the men's pole vault at the 1908 Summer Olympics.

References

1890 births
Year of death missing
Athletes (track and field) at the 1908 Summer Olympics
Hungarian male pole vaulters
Olympic athletes of Hungary
Place of birth missing